Wilmington Township is located in Will County, Illinois, United States. As of the 2010 census, its population was 6,193 and it contained 2,811 housing units.

Geography

Demographics

References

External links
City-data.com
Will County Official Site
Illinois State Archives

Townships in Will County, Illinois
Townships in Illinois
1849 establishments in Illinois